In historical linguistics and language contact, unpacking is the separation of the features of a segment into distinct segments. 

Perhaps the most common example of unpacking is the separation of nasal vowels into vowel plus nasal consonant when borrowed into languages which don't have nasal vowels. This can be seen in English borrowings of French and Portuguese words, such as monsoon  from Portuguese  , but occurs widely, as in Lingala  from French  "balance". Here the nasality of the vowel is separated out as a nasal consonant. If this did not happen, the nasality would be lost. 

Unpacking occurs not just in borrowings, but within a language over time. For example, Armenian changed the Proto-Indo European syllabic resonants *m̥, *n̥, *r̥, and *l̥ into am, an, ar, and al, keeping the syllabic nature of the sound while preserving the consonant value. Thus, the privative prefix *n̥- has changed into  , and the word *mr̥tos has become  .

See also
 Fusion, the opposite of unpacking
 Vowel breaking

References
Crowley, Terry. (1997) An Introduction to Historical Linguistics. 3rd edition. Oxford University Press.  

Sound changes